Chris Chike, otherwise known online as iamchris4life or CHRS4LFE, is an American esports player known for his skill in a variety of music video games.

Notable accomplishments

Guitar Hero

Chris holds the official Guinness world record for "Highest score for a single song on Guitar Hero III: Legends of Rock". On March 11, 2008, he managed to achieve 97 percent completion rate and 840,647 points in DragonForce's "Through the Fire and Flames" in front of Guinness judges. He became the first person to achieve a full combo (hitting every note without losing a combo) on the song, scoring 987,786 points.

Chris was crowned the Guitar Hero III champion at the National Play N Trade tournament in Bloomington, Minnesota. Local tournaments were held March 15 and 16, with close to 1,000 gamers at more than 100 Play N Trade video game stores across the country competing. He won $2,000 from his first-place performance in the song, "Through the Fire and Flames".

Dance Dance Revolution
Chris took 1st place in Dance Dance Revolution at the 6th Annual Konami Arcade Championship Finals on February 11, 2017, taking place at the Japan Amusement Expo 2017. This was the first year that players from North America were allowed to participate.

Chris automatically qualified for the 7th Annual Konami Arcade Championship, which took place on February 10, 2018, due to winning the championship the year prior. He ultimately finished as the runner-up to Korean DDR player Yoon Sang Yeon, also known as FEFEMZ.

Chris was seeded #1 in the world for the 8th Konami Arcade Championship, held in January 2019. However, he was again the runner-up, as FEFEMZ repeated his first-place finish.

Chris was seeded #1 in the world for the 9th Konami Arcade Championship, held in February 2020. He finished first place.

As of 2022, Chris currently holds over 30 world score records on songs in Konami's second most recent DDR version, DanceDanceRevolution A20 Plus. He is the first player to Perfect Full Combo (obtaining a "perfect" or higher judgment on all arrows) a level 19 difficulty song. Chris is also the first to Marvelous Full Combo (obtaining a "marvelous" judgment on all arrows and obtaining the highest possible score) a level 18 song.

On March 5, 2022, Chris became the first person to gain a Marvelous Full Combo on every song from Levels 1-16 in DDR A20 Plus, an achievement which entails gaining a Marvelous Full Combo on over 4000 charts.

References

Living people
1991 births
American esports players
Guitar Hero players
People from Rochester, Minnesota
University of Pennsylvania alumni